The Dynamite Duumvirate Tag Team Title Tournament (DDT4) was an annual professional wrestling tag team tournament produced by Pro Wrestling Guerrilla (PWG) between 2007 and 2015. The inaugural tournament was contested for the vacant PWG World Tag Team Championship. Reigning champions entered the tournament and defended the title in each round of the tournament for five editions (2008, 2009, 2010, 2013 and 2015) while three editions (2011, 2012 and 2014) of the tournament were used to determine the number one contenders to the champions.

Winners, dates, venues and main events

Championship match for winner
 – Championship victory
 – Championship match loss

The inaugural DDT4 tournament in 2007 was contested for the vacant PWG World Tag Team Championship while the titles were defended in the 2008, 2009, 2010, 2013 and 2015 editions of the tournament.

Results

DDT4 (2007)

DDT4 (2008)

DDT4 (2009)
The third DDT4 was held on May 22, 2009, in Reseda, California, with The Young Bucks (Matt Jackson and Nick Jackson) entering the tournament as the reigning and defending champions. Originally the teams of The Hybrid Dolphins (Bryan Danielson and Paul London), Chris Hero and Roderick Strong and Los Luchas (Phoenix Star and Zokre) were announced for the tournament, however, Los Luchas were replaced at the event by the reuniting Dark & Lovely (Human Tornado and Scorpio Sky), while London was forced to back out of the tournament due to an injury. Strong ended up taking his place, while Hero moved on to defend his PWG World Championship, which resulted in The Motor City Machine Guns (Alex Shelley and Chris Sabin) getting a bye in the first round of the tournament.

Participants
Men of Low Moral Fiber (Chuck Taylor and Kenny Omega)
The Cutler Brothers (Brandon Cutler and Dustin Cutler)
Dark & Lovely (Human Tornado and Scorpio Sky)
The Dynasty (Joey Ryan and Scott Lost)
Hybrid Dolphins (Bryan Danielson and Roderick Strong)
The Motor City Machine Guns (Alex Shelley and Chris Sabin)
The Young Bucks (Matt Jackson and Nick Jackson)

DDT4 (2010)
The fourth DDT4 was held on May 9, 2010, in Reseda, California, with The Young Bucks (Matt Jackson and Nick Jackson) entering the tournament as the reigning and defending champions.

Participants
The Briscoe Brothers (Jay Briscoe and Mark Briscoe)
Chuck Taylor and Scott Lost
The Cutler Brothers (Brandon Cutler and Dustin Cutler)
Jerome Robinson and Johnny Goodtime
KAMIKAZE (Akira Tozawa and YAMATO)
¡Peligro Abejas! (El Generico and Paul London)
Roderick Strong and Ryan Taylor
The Young Bucks (Matt Jackson and Nick Jackson)

DDT4 (2011)
The fifth DDT4 was held on March 4, 2011, in Reseda, California. The reigning PWG World Tag Team Champions, ¡Peligro Abejas! (El Generico and Paul London), were not entered into the tournament, instead it would be used to determine their number one contenders.

Participants
The American Wolves (Davey Richards and Eddie Edwards)
Brandon Gatson and Willie Mack
The Briscoe Brothers (Jay Briscoe and Mark Briscoe)
The Cutler Brothers (Brandon Cutler and Dustin Cutler)
The Kings of Wrestling (Chris Hero and Claudio Castagnoli)
Nightmare Violence Connection (Akira Tozawa and Kevin Steen)
The RockNES Monsters (Johnny Goodtime and Johnny Yuma)
The Young Bucks (Matt Jackson and Nick Jackson)

DDT4 (2012)
The sixth DDT4 was held on April 21, 2012, in Reseda, California. Appetite for Destruction (Kevin Steen and Super Dragon) was scheduled to enter the tournament as the defending PWG World Tag Team Champions, but on April 4 it was announced that Dragon had fractured his heel and would be forced out of the tournament. The champions were replaced by El Generico and Willie Mack in the tournament, which would instead be used to determine their number one contenders.

Participants
2 Husky Black Guys (El Generico and Willie Mack)
The Dynasty (Joey Ryan and Scorpio Sky)
Future Shock (Adam Cole and Kyle O'Reilly)
The Fightin' Taylor Boys (Brian Cage-Taylor and Ryan Taylor)
RockNES Monsters (Johnny Goodtime and Johnny Yuma)
Roderick Strong and Sami Callihan
The Super Smash Bros. (Player Uno and Stupefied)
The Young Bucks (Matt Jackson and Nick Jackson)

DDT4 (2013)
The seventh DDT4 was announced on the official PWG Twitter account on December 2, 2012. It took place on January 12, 2013, with the previous year's winners the Super Smash Bros. (Player Uno and Stupefied) entering the tournament as the reigning and defending World Tag Team Champions. Originally, El Generico and Kevin Steen were scheduled to team up, but after Generico received an injury, he was forced to pull out of the tournament. Willie Mack was named his replacement, but this once again changed on January 9, when PWG announced that El Generico, in the midst of reports that he had signed with WWE, would be teaming with his previously announced partner, Kevin Steen.

Participants
The Briscoe Brothers (Jay Briscoe and Mark Briscoe)
DojoBros (Eddie Edwards and Roderick Strong)
El Generico and Kevin Steen
Future Shock (Adam Cole and Kyle O'Reilly)
The Inner City Machine Guns (Rich Swann and Ricochet)
The Super Smash Bros. (Player Uno and Stupefied)
Unbreakable F'n Machines (Brian Cage and Michael Elgin)
The Young Bucks (Matt Jackson and Nick Jackson)

DDT4 (2014)
The eighth DDT4 was announced on the official PWG Twitter account on December 23, 2013. It took place on January 31, 2014, in Reseda, California. The reigning PWG World Tag Team Champions, The Young Bucks, did not enter the tournament.

Participants
African-American Wolves (A. C. H. and A. R. Fox)
Best Friends (Chuck Taylor and Trent?)
Cole Steen Cole (Adam Cole and Kevin Steen)
The Inner City Machine Guns (Rich Swann and Ricochet)
PPRay (Peter Avalon and Ray Rosas)
RockNES Monsters (Johnny Goodtime and Johnny Yuma)
Unbreakable F'n Machines (Brian Cage and Michael Elgin)
World's Cutest Tag Team (Candice LeRae and Joey Ryan)

DDT4 (2015)
The ninth DDT4 was announced on the official PWG Twitter account on April 5, 2015. It took place on May 22, 2015. World's Cutest Tag Team entered the tournament as the reigning PWG World Tag Team Champions and the title was defended throughout the tournament. Chris Sabin was scheduled to enter the tournament as Matt Sydal's partner, but was on May 21 pulled from the tournament with a back injury and replaced by Mike Bailey. For the first time, the PWG World Tag Team Championship changed hands in each round of the tournament.

Participants
Andrew Everett and Trevor Lee
Beaver Boys (Alex Reynolds and John Silver)
Biff Busick and Drew Gulak
The Inner City Machine Guns (Rich Swann and Ricochet)
Matt Sydal and Mike Bailey
Monster Mafia (Ethan Page and Josh Alexander)
Team Tremendous (Bill Carr and Dan Barry)
World's Cutest Tag Team (Candice LeRae and Joey Ryan)

References

Tag team tournaments
Professional wrestling shows
Recurring events established in 2007
Recurring events disestablished in 2015
Professional wrestling in Los Angeles
Professional wrestling tournaments
Pro Wrestling Guerrilla
Pro Wrestling Guerrilla events
Dynamite Duumvirate Tag Team Title Tournament